Frank Bayly (9 August 1860 – 23 November 1948) was a New Zealand cricketer. He played one first-class match for Taranaki in 1882/83.
 
He was one of six brothers who represented Taranaki at cricket and rugby, including:
 Alfred Bayly (1866-1901), Taranaki cricket and rugby representative. New Zealand rugby representative and captain. 
 George Bayly (1856-1938), Taranaki cricket and rugby representative. President of the Taranaki and New Zealand Rugby Union. 
 Harry Bayly (1862–1935), Taranaki cricket representative.
 Walter Bayly (1869–1950), Taranaki and New Zealand rugby representative.

See also
 List of Taranaki representative cricketers

References

External links
 

1860 births
1948 deaths
New Zealand cricketers
Taranaki cricketers
Cricketers from New Plymouth